Şəfili (also, Shafili and Shafily) is a village and the least populous municipality in the Qabala Rayon of Azerbaijan.  It has a population of 198.

References 

Populated places in Qabala District